Albert Zénophile Aubin (July 6, 1891 – March 20, 1957) was an Ontario political figure. He represented Sturgeon Falls in the Legislative Assembly of Ontario from 1929 to 1934 as a Conservative member.

He was born in Cumber, Ontario, the son of Azaire Adulphe Aubin, and educated in Rigaud, Quebec and at Osgoode Hall. He married Jeannette Bourdon. Aubin lived in Sturgeon Falls. He died at Riverside County, California in 1957.

References 

 Canadian Parliamentary Guide, 1930, AL Normandin

External links 
 

1891 births
1957 deaths
Franco-Ontarian people
People from West Nipissing
Progressive Conservative Party of Ontario MPPs